Erythrina senegalensis, the Senegal coraltree, is a plant in the pea family Fabaceae, native to West Africa.

Description
The bark is fissured. Inflorescences have many flowers with bright red petals. The seeds are poisonous.

Distribution and habitat
Erythrina senegalensis is native to West Africa, across the region from Mauritania to Chad and Cameroon. Its habitat is in wooded grassland or savanna.

Uses
Erythrina senegalensis is locally used in traditional medicine. The wood is locally used to make knife handles and the seeds to make necklaces. The species is cultivated as an ornamental and also used in hedges.

References

senegalensis
Flora of West Tropical Africa
Flora of Chad
Flora of Cameroon
Plants described in 1825
Taxa named by Augustin Pyramus de Candolle